Viễn Đông Daily News is one of the three largest Vietnamese-language newspapers published seven days a week by Vietnamese overseas.

Founded in 1993, its headquarters is situated in the Little Saigon neighborhood of Westminster, California. The newspaper's auditorium, is one of the oldest places hosting Vietnamese-American community and cultural events.

References

External links
Vien Dong Daily News

Mass media in Orange County, California
Vietnamese-language newspapers published in California
Westminster, California
Publications established in 1993
1993 establishments in California
Daily newspapers published in Greater Los Angeles